Anolis chloris, Boulenger's green anole, is a species of lizard in the family Dactyloidae. The species is found in Ecuador, Colombia, and Panama.

References

Anoles
Reptiles of Ecuador
Reptiles of Colombia
Reptiles of Panama
Reptiles described in 1898
Taxa named by George Albert Boulenger